The term Thraco-Roman describes the Romanized culture of Thracians under the rule of the Roman Empire.

The Odrysian kingdom of Thrace became a Roman client kingdom c. 20 BC, while the Greek city-states on the Black Sea coast came under Roman control, first as civitates foederatae ("allied" cities with internal autonomy). After the death of the Thracian king Rhoemetalces III in 46 AD and an unsuccessful anti-Roman revolt, the kingdom was annexed as the Roman province of Thracia. The northern Thracians (Getae-Dacians) formed a unified kingdom of Dacia, before being conquered by the Romans in 106 and their land turned into the Roman province of Dacia.

Archaeological sites 
 The Thraco-Roman Villa Rustica near Chatalka, Stara Zagora, Bulgaria
 Thraco-Roman Cult Complex built in the rocks near Strelkovo, Bulgaria

Famous individuals 
This is a list of several important Thraco-Roman individuals:
 Maximinus Thrax, Roman Emperor from 235 to 238.
 Regalianus, Roman general and imperial usurper.
 Aureolus, Roman military commander and imperial usurper.
 Galerius, Roman Emperor from 305 to 311.
 Licinius, Roman emperor from 308 to 324.
 Maximinus Daza, Roman emperor from 310 to 313.
 Flavius Aetius, Roman general, called "the last of the Romans".
 Leo I, Eastern Roman emperor from 457 to 474.
 John Cassian, a 4th-century monk who contributed to bringing the Egyptian monastic tradition to Western Europe. Born in Scythia Minor and died near modern-day Marseilles, southern France 
 Dionysius Exiguus, a 6th-century monk born in Scythia Minor, most likely of local Thraco-Roman origin.
 Justin I, Byzantine Emperor from 518 to 527, was possibly of Thraco-Roman or Illyro-Roman stock.
 Vitalian, an East Roman general who rebelled in 513 against Emperor Anastasius I (r. 491–518). Vitalian may have been of local Thracian stock, born in Scythia Minor or in Moesia; his father bore a Latin name, Patriciolus, while two of his sons had Thracian names and one a Gothic name.
 Justinian I, Byzantine Emperor from 527 to 565 and born in Tauresium around 482. His Latin-speaking peasant family is believed to have been of Thraco-Roman or Illyro-Roman origins.
 Belisarius, a general during the reign of Justinian I. He was born in Germane (nowadays Sapareva Banya) in Western Thrace, possibly of Thraco-Roman or Illyro-Roman origin. Commanded several campaigns for reconquering Mediterranean territory of the former Western Roman Empire.
 Phocas, Byzantine emperor from 602 to 610.

See also 
 Daco-Roman
 Illyro-Roman
 Origin of the Romanians

Further reading 
  Sorin Olteanu,  The administrative organisation of the Balkan provinces in the 6th century AD
  Stelian Brezeanu: Toponymy and ethnic Realities at the Lower Danube in the 10th Century. “The deserted Cities" in Constantine Porphyrogenitus' De administrando imperio
  Kelley L. Ross The Vlach Connection and Further Reflections on Roman History

Notes

References 

 Nicolae Saramandru: “Torna, Torna Fratre”; Bucharest, 2001–2002; Online: .pdf.
 Nicolae-Șerban Tanașoca: “«Torna, torna, fratre» et la romanité balkanique au VI e siècle” ("Torna, torna, fratre, and Balkan Romanity in the 6th century") Revue roumaine de linguistique, XXXVIII, Bucharest, 1993.
 Nicolae Iorga: “Geschichte des rumänischen Volkes im Rahmen seiner Staatsbildungen” ("History of the Romanian people in the context of its statal formation"), I, Gotha, 1905; “Istoria românilor” ("History of the Romanians"), II, Bucharest, 1936. Istoria României ("History of Romania"), I, Bucharest, 1960.
 

Ancient Roman culture
Romanization of Southeastern Europe
Eastern Romance people
History of the Romanian language
Eastern Romance languages
Roman assimilation